Sayid Ahmad I was a khan of the Golden Horde from 1427 or 1433 until 1455. Unlike the last five of six khans, Ahmad was a younger son of Tokhtamysh.

Breakup of the Horde

While he died before the Horde dissolved, historians believe that Sayid Ahmad was responsible for creating the conditions in the khanate which allowed it to happen.

Genealogy
Genghis Khan
Jochi
Orda Khan
Sartaqtay
Köchü
Bayan
Sasibuqa
Ilbasan
Chimtay
Tuli Kwadja
Tokhtamysh
Sayid Ahmad

References

Khans of the Golden Horde
15th-century monarchs in Europe
Year of birth unknown
1455 deaths